Samuel Haynes may refer to:

 Samuel Haynes (historian) (died 1752), English writer and historian
 Samuel Johnson Haynes (1852–1932), Australian lawyer and politician
 Samuel Alfred Haynes (1899–1971), Belizean writer and political activist
 Sammie Haynes (1920–1997), American baseball player